is a Japanese four-panel gag comedy manga series written and illustrated by Kaduho which began serialization in Houbunsha's Manga Time Kirara Carat from July 2008. It follows the school lives of a high school girl Yasuna Oribe and her friends Sonya, an assassin, and Agiri Goshiki, a ninja. An anime television series adaptation animated by J.C.Staff aired in Japan between January 5, 2012 and March 29, 2012, with an OVA episode released on October 16, 2013.

Characters

A normal high school girl and self proclaimed friend of Sonya, who is often friendly to Sonya despite how dangerous she is. She tends to take on the brunt of Sonya's attacks whenever she takes her by surprise or goes overboard with her pranks. She is quite simple minded and is not afraid of Sonya at all, despite the fact that she is an assassin.

A foreign trained assassin attending a regular high school. As she constantly takes on assassin work she is constantly alert and often attacks Yasuna when she takes her by surprise or tries to play jokes on her. Despite her tough composure, she is scared of various things such as cockroaches, ghosts, and dogs (even domestic dogs).  She also has been shown to care a little for Yasuna.

A laid back ninja from the same organization as Sonya. She transferred to Sonya's school for some assignments and stays at a former ninja club room without permission. She often perplexes Sonya and Yasuna with dubious 'ninjutsus'. She is shown to be calm and have long purplish hair.

A redheaded, green-eyed, nameless character who was supposed to be part of the main cast, but was dropped as Yasuna had supposedly taken on all her personality traits. She has since vowed revenge against Yasuna and Sonya.

Media

Manga
Kill Me Baby began its serialization in the July 2008 issue of Manga Time Kirara Carat manga magazine after a prototype of the strip was published in an earlier issue of the magazine. Houbunsha published the first compilation volume on January 27, 2009, with thirteen volumes published.

Anime
An anime adaptation by J.C.Staff aired on TBS between January 5, 2012 and March 29, 2012. These theme songs and all of background music are composed by EXPO, a synthpop group consisting Kimitaka Matsumae and Suguru Yamaguchi. The series has been licensed in North America by Sentai Filmworks. A CD Album, Kill Me Baby Super, was released on October 16, 2013 and includes an original video animation.

Episode list

Video game
Characters from the series appear alongside other Manga Time Kirara characters in the 2017 mobile RPG, Kirara Fantasia.

Reception
Theron Martin of Anime News Network found some of the humor repetitious and the mediocre animation as the series' faults but said that it was balanced out with material that did garner laughs and a workmanlike dub, calling it "a series probably best-enjoyed one or two episodes at a time; trying to marathon it can be a brain-melting experience and is so not recommended. Keep it to smaller doses, though, and it delivers often enough to make a reliable comedy diversion." Aiden Foote, writing for the Anime Reviews, also found the animation middling but praised the slapstick humor and its delivery by both Yasuna and Sonya, concluding that "Overall, almost from nothing, Kill Me Baby! seems to have itself a sweet little niche in the congested four-panel market. What it lacks in a large cast, it makes up for by diligently bringing the characters it does use to life."

Music in the anime 
 (Opening Theme) "Kill Me no Baby! (キルミーのベイベー!)" by Yasuna and Sonya (Chinatsu Akasaki & Mutsumi Tamura)
 (Ending Theme)  "Futari no Kimochi no Honto no Himitsu (ふたりのきもちのほんとのひみつ)" by Yasuna and Sonya (Chinatsu Akasaki & Mutsumi Tamura)
 Kill Me Baby Character Song Agiri Akichi to Noraneko
 Kill Me Baby Character Song Yasuna Kyou Mo Futari De
 Kill Me Baby Character Song Sonya Yakisoba Pan
 Kaerimichi - EXPO (Kill Me Baby)

Notes

References

External links 
 TBS Official Site
 "Substantially Official Site"
 

2008 manga
2012 anime television series debuts
Comedy anime and manga
Houbunsha manga
J.C.Staff
Manga series
Seinen manga
Yonkoma
Sentai Filmworks
Slice of life anime and manga
TBS Television (Japan) original programming
2012 Japanese television series endings
Anime series based on manga